FACSAT-1 is the second Colombian-made satellite sent to orbit, and the first on behalf of the Colombian Air Force.

Characteristics
FACSAT-1 is a nanosatellite, capable of taking images with a resolution of 30 meters per pixel.

Manufacture
The contract to manufacture FACSAT-1 was awarded to GomSpace A/S in 2014.

Launch
FACSAT-1 was launched on November 29, 2018 at 04:15 UTC in the PSLV-C43 rocket of the Indian Space Agency (ISRO).

See also
 Libertad 1

References

Earth imaging satellites
Satellites of Colombia
2018 in Colombia
2018 in spaceflight